Déville-lès-Rouen (literally Déville near Rouen) is a commune in the Seine-Maritime department of the Normandy region in north-western France.

Geography

Heraldry

Population

Places of interest
 The church of St.Pierre, dating from the nineteenth century.
 The ruins of a Rouen bishop's manor house dating from the thirteenth century.
 A sixteenth-century stone cross.

Notable people
 Pierre Bérégovoy (1925–1993), politician, was born here.
 Tony Parker, basketball player, went to school here at Sainte-Marie college.
 Alfred Louis Delattre (1850–1932), archeologist, was born here.

Twin towns
 Bargteheide, Germany
 Carmignano, Italy
 Syston, England

See also
Communes of the Seine-Maritime department

References

External links

Independent website of Déville-lès-Rouen 
Official website 

Communes of Seine-Maritime